The Rand-Robinson KR-3 is an American amphibious aircraft that was designed by Ken Rand.

Design and development
The KR-3 is a two-seat composite construction amphibious aircraft. The landing gear is hydraulically retractable. The prototype was demonstrated at the EAA airshow in 1977, demonstrating water taxi tests.

Specifications (KR-3)

See also

References

Homebuilt aircraft